P.O.A.: Pop on Arrival is the 5th album released by Japanese band Beat Crusaders, and the 1st full-length album released under the DefSTAR Records Label. It was released May 11, 2005. Upon its release, there were two versions available, the Original Version and Limited Edition (初回生産限定盤; The first production limited board). The Original features 14 tracks, while the Limited Edition includes Bonus Tracks "Get Up! Get Up!" and "Say Good-Night" which differentiate the order of tracks on either CD.

Tracks 
Limited Edition CD
 "Nampla" – 0:32
 "Isolations" – 2:15
 "Hit in the USA" – 2:59
 "Feel" – 2:47
 "Lovepotion #9" – 2:48
 "Get Up! Get Up! (bonus track)" – 2:46
 "Clown for the Day" – 3:12
 "Sasquatch" – 1:37
 "Japanese Girl" – 2:32
 "Love Is Inspiration" – 1:56
 "Disaster" – 3:01
 "Love Dischord" – 4:02
 "Block Bastard" – 3:42
 "Rusk" – 2:58
 "Say Good-Night (bonus track)" – 3:24
 "S×E×X×I×S×T" – 1:44

References 

2005 albums
Beat Crusaders albums